Stanley Eugene Zin is a Canadian economist.  He is the William R. Berkley Professor Economics and Business at the Leonard N. Stern School of Business, New York University.

His research interests are in the areas of asset pricing and macroeconomics.  He is well known for his work on Epstein–Zin preferences which provide a recursive specification of a utility function which separates the elasticity of intertemporal substitution from the coefficient of relative risk aversion.  For this contribution he was awarded the Frisch Medal by the Econometric Society.

Previously, from 1988 to 2009 he was the Richard M. Cyert and Morris H. DeGroot Professor of Economics and Statistics at the David A. Tepper School of Business (previously the Graduate School of Industrial Administration) at Carnegie Mellon University, and is a research associate at the National Bureau of Economic Research.

Zin received his undergraduate education at the University of Windsor (B.A. in Economics; 1979) and his graduate training at Wayne State University (Master of Economics; 1981), and the University of Toronto (Ph.D in Economics; 1987).

External links
 Personal homepage
 IDEAS/RePEc
 NBER publications

21st-century Canadian economists
20th-century Canadian economists
Financial economists
Fellows of the Econometric Society
Carnegie Mellon University faculty
New York University faculty
Wayne State University alumni
University of Toronto alumni
University of Windsor alumni
Living people
1958 births